The 2021 season was the Miami Dolphins' 52nd season in the National Football League, their 56th overall, and their third and final year under head coach Brian Flores, and sixth under general manager Chris Grier. Despite a 1–7 start to the season, Miami then won the next seven games, becoming the first team in NFL history to lose seven straight games and then win seven straight games in the same season. The 7-game win streak was their first since the 1985 season. They also became the sixth team in NFL history to win four or more consecutive games after losing seven in a row, after the 2009 Cleveland Browns, 1994 New York Giants, 1993 New England Patriots, 1984 Green Bay Packers, and the 1978 St. Louis Cardinals. However the Dolphins were eliminated from the playoffs for the fifth consecutive year after their win streak ended in Week 17 to the Tennessee Titans, combined with a win by the Los Angeles Chargers.

Some highlights from the season included head coach Brian Flores becoming the first Dolphins coach since Don Shula to beat the Patriots multiple times in New England, Miami's first wins over the Carolina Panthers and New Orleans Saints since 2009 and 2005 respectively, their first win over the New York Giants since 2003 (which was also Miami's first ever home win over the Giants), and finally their first win in Caesars Superdome since 1986. The Dolphins also swept the New York Jets in back-to-back years for the first time since the 1996 and 1997 seasons, swept the New England Patriots for the first time since 2000, and had consecutive winning seasons for the first time since 2002–2003. However in a surprise move and due to alleged conflicts with both the roster and front office, owner Stephen M. Ross dismissed head coach Brian Flores on January 10, 2022.

Offseason and training camp
On January 5, 2021, Dolphins' offensive coordinator Chan Gailey announced his resignation. On February 2, the Dolphins announced coaches Eric Studesville and George Godsey would share the offensive coordinator position for the upcoming 2021 season.

On May 25, 2021, the NFL announced training camp for all teams will commence on July 27. This will mark the first time the Dolphins have training camp at the new training facility adjacent to Hard Rock Stadium in Miami Gardens, Florida.

On May 26, Tua Tagovailoa, when reflecting on the 2020 season, said he wasn't comfortable calling plays and he didn't know the playbook really well. He added he feels much more comfortable now. On June 15, during the first day of minicamp and during a heavy downpour of rain, Tagovailoa threw five interceptions. He explained later that during minicamp the team had decided to be more aggressive with riskier throws to see what would happen and that they can now learn from the results.

Atlanta Falcons' head coach  Arthur Smith announced his team would hold joint practices with the Miami Dolphins sometime around August 21 at Hard Rock Stadium.

On July 27, 2021, All-Pro cornerback Xavien Howard officially requested a trade from the Dolphins over a months-long contract dispute. Despite this, just twelve days later on August 8, 2021, the Dolphins agreed to restructure the cornerback's contract. The deal adds more guaranteed money and incentives, possibly making his payout over $16.285 million.

Draft

Staff

Final roster

Preseason

Regular season

Schedule
The Dolphins' 2021 schedule was announced on May 12.

Note: Intra-division opponents are in bold text.

Game summaries

Week 1: at New England Patriots

The Dolphins take sole possession of first place in the AFC East with this win as they improved to 1–0, their first such start since 2018. It was also the first time since 2017 that the Patriots had lost a season opener. Head coach Brian Flores also became the first Dolphins head coach since Don Shula to beat New England multiple times in Foxboro.

Week 2: vs. Buffalo Bills

Despite forcing two turnovers to extend their streak of games with takeaways to 24, the Dolphins suffered their worst loss to the Bills with a 35–0 shutout by Buffalo. Quarterback Tua Tagovailoa suffered a rib injury in the first quarter, forcing backup Jacoby Brissett to finish the game in his stead.

Week 3: at Las Vegas Raiders

Week 4: vs. Indianapolis Colts

Week 5: at Tampa Bay Buccaneers

Week 6: at Jacksonville Jaguars
NFL London games

Week 7: vs. Atlanta Falcons

Week 8: at Buffalo Bills

Week 9: vs. Houston Texans

Week 10: vs. Baltimore Ravens

Week 11: at New York Jets

Week 12: vs. Carolina Panthers

Week 13: vs. New York Giants

The Dolphins defeated the Giants at home for the first time in franchise history, and defeated them for the first time since 2003. The 2021 Dolphins also became the first team since the 1994 Giants to win at least 5 straight games after losing 7 in a row. Quarterback Tua Tagovailoa became the first Dolphins quarterback since Dan Marino in 1994 to throw at least 21 completions in the first half of a game.

Week 15: vs. New York Jets

This was the Dolphins' first time since 1997 that they swept the Jets in back-to-back years.

Week 16: at New Orleans Saints

With the win against a depleted Saints team who had 20 players on their IL, the Dolphins improved to 8–7, and became the first team in NFL history to win 7 straight games after losing 7 straight games. This was their first 7-game winning streak since 1985, during the Don Shula and Dan Marino era and their first win over the Saints since 2005. It was also their first road win over the Saints since 1986. Wide receiver Jaylen Waddle caught 10 receptions, the most by a rookie wide receiver in a single Monday Night game since Jerry Rice in 1985.

Week 17: at Tennessee Titans
 
This was Titans quarterback Ryan Tannehill's first time playing his former team since the Dolphins traded him following the 2018 season. Tannehill had played for the Dolphins from 2012–2018 as their primary starter aside from missing the 2017 season due a torn ACL he suffered during the preseason that year. The Dolphins' seven-game win streak was snapped by the 34–3 loss and failed to win 8 games in a row for the first time since 1984; because of this and the Buffalo Bills beating and eliminating the Atlanta Falcons and clinching playoff berth, the New England Patriots blowing out the Jacksonville Jaguars and clinching playoff berth, the Las Vegas Raiders beating the Indianapolis Colts, and the Los Angeles Chargers beating the Denver Broncos, the Dolphins missed the playoffs for the fifth season in a row. Additionally, the Chargers win also crushed all playoff hopes for the Denver Broncos, as well as the Cleveland Browns, who were scheduled to kick off Sunday Night Football later that evening.

Week 18: vs. New England Patriots

This was the Dolphins' first sweep of the Patriots since 2000 and their second under Bill Belichick's tenure. It was also first time since the 2002 and 2003 seasons that the Dolphins had clinched back-to-back winning seasons. Recording his 102nd reception early in the 1st quarter, wide receiver Jaylen Waddle became the all-time leader in receptions caught by a rookie wide receiver, surpassing Anquan Boldin, whom caught 101 receptions in his 2003 rookie season with the Arizona Cardinals. With the win, the Dolphins finished the season with a record of 9-8, but head coach Brian Flores was dismissed the next day.

Standings

Division

Conference

References

External links
 

Miami
Miami Dolphins seasons
Miami Dolphins